Messiasia is a genus of flies in the family Mydidae.

Species

 Messiasia californica Cole, 1970
 Messiasia carioca Wilcox, 1975
 Messiasia carrerai Andretta, 1951
 Messiasia dalcyana Andretta, 1951
 Messiasia decor (Osten Sacken, 1886)
 Messiasia lanei Andretta, 1951
 Messiasia mocoronga Wilcox, 1975
 Messiasia notospila (Wiedemann, 1828)
 Messiasia painteri Wilcox, 1975
 Messiasia penai Wilcox, 1975
 Messiasia pertenuis (Johnson, 1926)
 Messiasia punicea (Seguy, 1928)
 Messiasia testaceiventris (Macquart, 1850)
 Messiasia uaupes Wilcox, 1975
 Messiasia virgata (Wiedemann, 1830)
 Messiasia wilcoxi Papavero, 1976
 Messiasia yacochuya Wilcox, 1975
 Messiasia zikani Andretta, 1951

References

Further reading

 

Mydidae
Articles created by Qbugbot
Asiloidea genera